Sidney Jones was an Australian cricketer. He played three first-class matches for New South Wales between 1862/63 and 1869/70.

See also
 List of New South Wales representative cricketers

References

External links
 

Year of birth missing
Year of death missing
Australian cricketers
New South Wales cricketers
Place of birth missing